Guillaume de Chanac (died December 30, 1383) was a French Benedictine who became a Cardinal.

He was abbot at Bèze Abbey, and then was abbot at Saint-Florent from 1354 to 1368. He was Bishop of Chartres and then Bishop of Mende, for brief periods up to 1371.

He supported the Collège de Chanac Pompadour in Paris, named after his great-uncle of the same name.

Notes

External links
 Biography
 Epitaph, old dictionary page with short biography

Year of birth unknown
1383 deaths
French Benedictines
14th-century French cardinals
Cardinal-bishops of Frascati
Bishops of Chartres
Bishops of Mende